Uprooted may refer to:

 Uprooted (Absent Element album), 2005
 Uprooted (The Antlers album), 2006
 Uprooted (The Rankin Family album), 1998
 Uprooted (novel), a 2015 fantasy novel written by Naomi Novik
 The Uprooted, a 1952 book about European migrations into the United States by Oscar Handlin